Alejandro Gómez Perez (born 22 April 1985) is a Venezuelan swimmer. At the 2012 Summer Olympics in London, he participated in the men's 1500 metre freestyle, but was eliminated in the qualifying heats. His mother Maria competed in the 1976 Summer Olympics in the 200 and 400m freestyle events.

Biography
Gómez was born on 22 April 1985 in Caracas, Venezuela. His mother Maria was an Olympic swimmer, and competed in the 1976 Summer Games in the 400m and 200m freestyle events. His father Renny Gómez played water polo at Master's age group and represented Venezuela at master's world champ 3 times – Montreal 94 where they earned a bronze medal, Sheffield 96 and Munich 2000. After graduating from Colegio Santiago de León de Caracas in 2002, Alejandro went to Indian River Community College in Fort Pierce, Florida, and later studied Communication Studies and human relations at Texas Christian University in Fort Worth, Texas, graduating in 2008.

Swimming
Gómez participates in the 1500m men's freestyle event, and the 800m men's freestyle swimming event. In 2010, he entered the 21st Central American and Caribbean Games in the men's 800 metre freestyle and the men's 1500 metre freestyle, winning both events. His time in the 1500m freestyle final on 18 July 2010 was 15:27.59, and he recorded a time of 8:10.53 in the 800m freestyle final on 20 July 2010. He currently trains with Gator Swim Club, Gainesville, Florida. In the 2012 Summer London Olympic Games, Gómez participated in the 1500 metres men's freestyle swimming event. He finished twenty-third in the qualifying heats with a time of 15:27.38, and was eliminated. Previously, Gómez represented Venezuela and won gold at the South American Games (ODESUR Games).

References

External links
 

1985 births
Living people
Sportspeople from Caracas
Venezuelan male freestyle swimmers
Olympic swimmers of Venezuela
Swimmers at the 2012 Summer Olympics
Swimmers at the 2015 Pan American Games
Swimmers at the 2011 Pan American Games
Pan American Games bronze medalists for Venezuela
Pan American Games medalists in swimming
South American Games gold medalists for Venezuela
South American Games bronze medalists for Venezuela
South American Games medalists in swimming
Central American and Caribbean Games gold medalists for Venezuela
Competitors at the 2002 South American Games
Competitors at the 2006 South American Games
Competitors at the 2010 South American Games
Competitors at the 2014 South American Games
Competitors at the 2010 Central American and Caribbean Games
Central American and Caribbean Games medalists in swimming
Medalists at the 2011 Pan American Games
20th-century Venezuelan people
21st-century Venezuelan people